Balfour is an unincorporated community in Mills County, in the U.S. state of Iowa.

History
Balfour was founded in 1902 when the Chicago, Burlington & Quincy Railroad bypassed Hillsdale. The new rail line opened in August 1904; Balfour soon had a stockyard, rail station, and general store/post office. The grange hall at Hillsdale was moved to Balfour and was dedicated on December 12, 1912.

The community's population was 25 in 1920.

By the 1930s, Balfour was being abandoned. The stockyards were used until 1939. The rail station was removed in the 1940s. Today, all that remains in Balfour are a few houses.

References

Unincorporated communities in Mills County, Iowa
Unincorporated communities in Iowa